Antiquities is a 2018 American comedy film directed by Daniel Campbell and starring Andrew J. West, Michaela Watkins, Michael Gladis, Ashley Greene and Mary Steenburgen.

Cast

Reception

References

External links
 
 

American comedy films
2018 comedy films
Films set in Arkansas
2010s English-language films
2010s American films